Kosina  is a village in the administrative district of Gmina Łańcut, within Łańcut County, Subcarpathian Voivodeship, in south-eastern Poland.

The village has a population of 3,500.

Notable people
 Leopold Lis-Kula, Polish Army officer

References

Villages in Łańcut County